Lizard Creek is a  tributary of the Lehigh River in  Schuylkill and Carbon counties, Pennsylvania in the United States.

Lizard Creek joins the Lehigh River near the borough of Bowmanstown.

See also
List of rivers of Pennsylvania

References

Tributaries of the Lehigh River
Rivers of Pennsylvania
Rivers of Carbon County, Pennsylvania
Rivers of Schuylkill County, Pennsylvania